Alan Devlin can refer to:

 Alan Devlin (actor) (1948–2011), Irish actor
 Alan Devlin (cricketer) (born 1959), New Zealand cricketer
 Alan Devlin (footballer) (born 1953), Scottish footballer